Luther Sheeleigh Cressman (October 24, 1897 – April 4, 1994) was an American field archaeologist, most widely known for his discoveries at  Paleo-Indian sites such as Fort Rock Cave and Paisley Caves, sites related to the early settlement of the Americas.

Early years
Cressman was born outside of Pottstown, Pennsylvania, the son of a physician. He was ordained an Episcopal priest in 1923. Majoring in Classics, he graduated with a B.A. degree from Pennsylvania State University in 1918. Feeling doubts about his vocation, he began studying sociology and anthropology at Columbia University in New York. He received his Ph.D. from Columbia in 1928, and that same year, he left the priesthood.

Career

In 1929, he took a position as Professor of Sociology at the University of Oregon. The Department of Anthropology was founded by him six years later. His first hire for the department was Homer Barnett. Cressman was the chair of the department from 1935 until his retirement in 1963.

He was the first professional archaeologist to excavate the Paisley Caves in 1938 and this research became his most significant discovery, when at the same year he discovered a pair of perfectly preserved shredded sagebrush bark sandals at Fort Rock in Oregon that were radiocarbon dated from 10,500 to 9,300 years old, making them the oldest footwear ever discovered. 

As late as 1962 he taught an Introduction to Anthropology course with another professor.  At the first lecture the younger professor said he struggled with how to address Dr. Cressman. They were peers by PhDs so it would have been all right to use his first name but since Cressman was greatly senior he said it didn't seem right to call him Lou, and left it there. Dr. Cressman pointed out he didn't tell us what he called him.  Dr. Cressman said, "He calls me, 'Doc'."

His autobiography A Golden Journey: Memoirs of an Archaeologist was awarded the 1989 Oregon Book Award for literary nonfiction.

Personal life

Cressman married anthropologist Margaret Mead in 1923; the couple divorced in 1927. He married Dorothy Cecelia Loch in 1928. They had one daughter and were married for 49 years, until her death in 1977.

Cressman died on April 4, 1994, in Eugene, Oregon. A memorial service was held at Gerlinger Hall on the UO campus on April 21 of that year.

Selected publications 
Klamath Prehistory (1956, OCLC 1574790)
The Sandal and the Cave (1962; 1981 reprint)
Prehistory of the Far West: Homes of Vanished Peoples (1977)
A Golden Journey: Memoirs of an Archaeologist (1988)

Awards 

Guggenheim Fellowship
John Alsop King Fellowship
Charles E. Johnson Memorial Award

References

Specific citations

General references

Luther Cressman at the Minnesota State University, Mankato
Bishop B.  "Northwest Archaeologist Luther Cressman, 96, Dies". Eugene Register Grand 7 April 1994.
Dana T.  " Oregon’s Luther Cressman Harbors no Regrets from Archaeological Storm". Oregonian 19 March 1987.
Ellis B., Dank H.,  "Anthropologist Luther Cressman Dies at age 96". Oregonian 8 April 1994.
Travis–Cline, S.  "Remembering the Golden Journey". Oregon Heritage 1994.

External links
Guide to the Luther Cressman papers at the University of Oregon

1897 births
1994 deaths
University of Oregon faculty
20th-century American archaeologists
People from Pottstown, Pennsylvania
Pennsylvania State University alumni
Columbia Graduate School of Arts and Sciences alumni